The Mansabdar was a military unit within the administrative system of the Mughal Empire introduced by Akbar. The word mansab is of Arabic origin meaning rank or position. The system determined the rank and status of a government official and military generals. Every civil and military officer was given a mansab, which determined their salaries & allowances. The term manasabadar means a person having a mansab. (which means a role)
In the mansabdari system founded by Akbar, the mansabdars were military commanders, high civil and military officers, and provincial governors. Those mansabdars whose rank was one thousand or below were called Amir, while those above 1,000 were called Amir-al Kabir (Great Amir). Some great Amirs whose ranks were above 5,000 were also given the title of Amir-al Umara (Amir of Amirs).

It was a system whereby nobles were granted the rights to hold a jagir, or revenue assignment (not land itself), for services rendered by them, with the direct control of these nobles in the hands of the king. Asad Yar Jung mentioned 66 grades of mansabdars, but in practice there were around 33 mansabs. During the early reign of Akbar, the lowest grade was ten and the highest was 5,000(later raised to 7,000). Higher mansabs were given to princes and Rajput rulers who accepted the suzerainty of the emperor.

History
It was prevalent during the reign of Babur and Humayun as well. Akbar made important changes to the system and made it more efficient.

Zat and Sawar

During later years of his reign, Akbar introduced the ranks of zat and sawar in the system. Different views have been expressed regarding these terms. According to Blochmann, every mansabdar had to maintain as many soldiers as were indicated by his rank of zat while the rank of sawar indicated the number of horsemen among them. Irlos IV expressed the view that zat indicated the actual number of cavalry under a mansabdar besides other soldiers while sawar was an additional honour.

According to I W Butlar, the rank of sawar was given to mansabdars to fix up their additional allowances. A mansabdar was paid rupees two per horse. Therefore, if a mansabdar received the rank of 500 sawar he was given rupees one thousand additional allowance. Abdul Aziz is of the opinion that while the rank of zat fixed the number of other soldiers under a mansabdar, the rank of sawar fixed the number of his horsemen.

A K Mathur has opined that while the rank of zat indicated the total number of soldiers under a mansabdar, the rank of sawar indicated the number of horsemen under him. During the reign of Akbar, the mansabdars were asked to keep as many horsemen as were indicated by numbers of their ranks of sawar. But, the practice was not be maintained by other Mughal emperors.

(a )No. of Sawar = the No. of Zat.   => 1st Class Mansabdar

(b)No. of Sawar > 1/2 the No. of Zat    => 2nd Class Mansabdar

(c)No. of Sawar < 1/2 the No. of Zat    => 3rd Class Mansabdar

Mansabdars were graded on the number of armed cavalrymen, or sowars, which each had to maintain for service in the imperial army. Thus, all mansabdars had a zat, or personal ranking, and a sowar, or a troop ranking. All servants of the empire, whether in the civil or military departments, were graded in this system.

There were thirty-three grades of mansabdars ranging from 'commanders of 10' to 'commanders of 10,000'. Till the middle of Akbar's reign, the highest rank an ordinary officer could hold was that of a commander of 5,000. The more exalted grades between commanders of 7,000 and 10,000 were reserved for the royal princes. During the period following Akbar's reign, the grades were increased up to 20,000 and 20-25 rupees per horse was paid to a mansabdar.

Additionally, there was no distinction between the civil and military departments. Both civil and military officers held mansabs and were liable to be transferred from one branch of the administration to another. Each mansabdar was expected to maintain prescribed number of horses, elephants, and equipment, according to his rank and dignity. These rules, though initially strictly enforced, were later slackened.
During Aurangzeb's reign the number of mansabdars was around 700 or more.

Main Features of mansabdari system

1. The king himself appointed the mansabdars. He could enhance the mansab, lower it or remove it.

2. A mansabdar could be asked to perform any civil or military service.

3. There were 33 categories of the mansabdars. The lowest mansabdar commanded 10 soldiers and the highest 10,000 soldiers. Only the princes of the royal family and most important Rajput rulers were given a mansab of 10,000.

4. Sometimes a mansabdar was paid his salary in cash also. Other source of income of mansabdar was grant of jagirs.

5. The salary due to the soldiers was added to the personal salary of the mansabdar. At times, for paying salaries to soldiers, a jagir was given to him. But the revenue was realised by officers and necessary adjustments made.

6. The mansabdari system was not hereditary.

7. In addition to meeting his personal expenses, the mansabdar had to maintain out of his salary a stipulated quota of horses, elephants, camels, mules and carts. A mansabdar holding a rank of 5,000 had to maintain 340 horses, 100 elephants, 400 camels, 100 mules and 160 carts.

8. Handsome salaries were paid to a mansabdar. A mansabdar with a rank of 5,000 got a salary of 30,000 rupees per month, one of 3,000 could get 17,000 rupees, while a mansabdar of 1,000 got 8,200 rupees.

9. The horses were classified into six categories and the elephants into five.

10. For every ten cavalry men, the mansabdar had to maintain twenty horses for horses that had to be provided rest while on a march and replacements were necessary in times of war.

11. A record was kept of the description (‘huliya’) of each horseman under a mansabdar and  branding (‘dag’) of horses to prevent corruption.

12. The troops raised by the emperor but not paid directly by the state and placed under the charge of mansabadars were known as Dakhili

Changes introduced by Jahangir and Shah Jahan
1. Difference in the highest mansab:
After Akbar, higher mansabs were introduced. During Jahangir and Shah Jahan’s reigns, the mansab of a prince was raised to 40,000 and 60,000 respectively as against of 12,000 during Akbar’s reign.

2. Reduction in the number of soldiers:
Shah Jahan reduced the number of soldiers kept by a mansabdar. Now each mansabdar was required to keep one-third of the original number. Sometimes, it was even reduced to one-fourth or one-fifth.

3. Difference in the categories of mansabdars:
During the time of Jahangir and Shah Jahan, the number of categories"of mansabdars was reduced to 11 as against 33 mentioned by Abul Fazl in his book Akbarnama.

4. Relaxation in control:
With Akbar’s death, the control exercised over mansabdars became a bit slack.

See also 
 Vakil of the Mughal Empire
 Subedar
 Sawar
 Sepoy
 Hyder Ali
 Mughal weapons
 Nawab
 Jagir

References

Further reading

Feudalism in Asia
Titles in India
Titles in Bangladesh
Feudalism in Pakistan
Government of the Mughal Empire
Indian feudalism
Mughal nobility